Thomas Wills Burgess (26 September 1888 – 26 May 1974) was a New Zealand cricket umpire. He stood in one Test match, New Zealand against England in 1933.

He umpired 20 first-class matches in Christchurch and one in Wellington between 1928 and 1947. His son Alan played first-class cricket for Canterbury from 1940 to 1952.

See also
 List of Test cricket umpires
 English cricket team in New Zealand in 1932–33

References

1888 births
1974 deaths
Sportspeople from Blackburn
New Zealand Test cricket umpires
English emigrants to New Zealand